Ercan Bayrak (born July 9, 1997) is a Turkish professional basketball player for Semt77 Yalovaspor of the Turkish Basketball League (TBL). Standing at he plays power forward and center position.

References

External links
 Ercan Bayrak at eurobasket.com
 Ercan Bayrak at euroleague.net
 Ercan Bayrak at FIBA
 Ercan Bayrak at realgm.com

1997 births
Living people
Basketball players from Istanbul
Fenerbahçe men's basketball players
Power forwards (basketball)
Turkish men's basketball players
Türk Telekom B.K. players
Yalovaspor BK players